Diego Junqueira won in the final 6–2, 6–1, against Juan Pablo Brzezicki.

Seeds

Draw

Finals

Top half

Bottom half

References
 Main Draw
 Qualifying Draw

Copa Topper - Singles
2010 Singles